The Constitutional Court of Belarus is one of the top-tier courts in the eastern European country. Created in 1994, the Court is run under guidelines that were issued in 1997. The purpose of the court is to render justice in areas where the constitution has come into question, such as a local law contradicting the constitution.  There are 12 judges that sit on the bench, with all having degrees in legal studies, as required by Belarusian law.  Six of the judges are appointed by the President while the other six are appointed by the Council of the Republic. Regardless of the manner of appointment, the judges sit on the bench for a term of 11 years.

Heads 

 Pyotr Milakshevich (since 2008)

See also
Constitution
Constitutionalism
Constitutional economics
Jurisprudence
Judiciary
Rule of law
Rule According to Higher Law

External links 

  
 Human Rights Committee views in case Pastukhov v. Belarus concerning dismissing one of the CC judges in 1997 

Law of Belarus
Government of Belarus
Belarus
1994 establishments in Belarus
Courts and tribunals established in 1994